Blandina Khondowe (12 October 1980 – 21 November 2020), born Blandina Mlenga, was best known for her role as Miss Malawi 2002 and for her breast cancer advocacy. She is  the founder of Think Pink – Malawi campaign for breast cancer awareness and the founder of Hope for Cancer Foundation. She was an advocate for breast cancer awareness and spoke 
about the lack of facilities and access to equitable management. She, until her death on 21 November 2020, worked as a civil servant for Malawi's Ministry of Tourism.

Background
Khondowe attended the University of Malawi and had a bachelor's degree in business marketing from Charles Sturt University and an MBA from a University of Wales Institute. She worked as the Principle Tourism Officer for the Ministry of Tourism. She worked in this ministry from 2008 to 2020 and she continued to judge for the Miss Malawi pageant.

Her own diagnoses of breast cancer in 2013 and 2017 led her to become a vocal advocate for breast cancer awareness in Malawi. When she was diagnosed with breast cancer in 2013, she began partnering with local companies and local NGOs to create awareness for breast cancer in the country. She founded the annual national Think Pink Walk with Magdelena Zgamvo in 2014 which promotes early detection of breast cancer. She founded the Hope for Cancer Foundation in 2015. The goal of this organization was to promote preventative approaches to cancer care.

She died from cancer on 20 November 2020. She is survived by two children and her husband, Christopher Khondowe.

Publications
 "Breast Cancer Screening in Low- and Middle-Income Countries: A Perspective From Malawi", Journal of Global Oncology,  Lily A. Gutnik, Beatrice Matanje-Mwagomba, Vanessa Msosa, Suzgo Mzumara, Blandina Khondowe, Agnes Moses, Racquel E. Kohler, Lisa A. Carey

Awards
Miss Malawi 2002
Barbara Brenner Breast Cancer Activist Scholarship 2019

See also
 Miss Malawi

References

Miss Malawi winners
Charles Sturt University alumni
Malawian activists
1980 births
2020 deaths